Philip H. Knight endowed chairs and professorships were established at the University of Oregon in 1996, when Penny and Phil Knight donated US$15 million for 27 endowed chairs and professorships, "to provide academic areas with a source of funds for recruiting and retaining faculty of superior academic quality". Chairs and professorships must be awarded on merit only, not longevity. Collectively, the Knight endowed chairs and professorships receive over US$325,000 in bonuses per year. The award for a Knight Chair is US$50,000, and US$25,000 for a Knight Professorship.

Phil and Penny Knight donated an endowment fund of US$5 million to the Stanford University Graduate School of Business in 2006.

In 2009, the Knights donated US$5 million to Willamette University for a School of Law endowed chair named for Alex L. Parks, Penny Knight's father, who served on the faculty of the School of Law.

Stanford University

University of Oregon

Previous University of Oregon Knight chairs and professors

Willamette University 
Symeon C. Symeonides, Alex L. Parks Distinguished Chair and Dean Emeritus of the College of Law

References

Educational institutions established in 1996
Education in Oregon
Professorships
Stanford University
University of Oregon
Willamette University College of Law
1996 establishments in Oregon